Lake Illawarra is a suburb of  Shellharbour, New South Wales, Australia located on the southern side of the Lake Illawarra entrance.

See also
 Lake Illawarra High School

References

Suburbs of Wollongong
City of Shellharbour